Echeveria minima, the miniature echeveria, is a species of flowering plant in the family Crassulaceae, native to northeast Mexico. It has small, blue-green rosettes with pink edges growing in clusters, and produces yellow bell-shaped flowers in the spring. A succulent, it has gained the Royal Horticultural Society's Award of Garden Merit.

Description
Echevarria minima has small, blue-green rosettes with the edges of the leaves in pink. It produces yellow bell-shaped flowers from a spike in the spring. It is not cold-hardy, so it will not tolerate temperatures below 20° F (-6.7° C), and is winter dormant, meaning it stops growing in winter. E.minima will produce small offsets, sprouting up around the base of the original plant, which means it will inevitably grow into clusters. Those offsets that have grown roots can be divided from the parent to make new individuals.

References

minima
Endemic flora of Mexico
Plants described in 1968